Canadian federal elections have provided the following results in Eastern Ontario.

Regional profile
This mostly rural region has historically split between the Conservatives and Liberals, though vote-splitting led to a Liberal sweep in 1993 and 1997. The merge of the former Canadian Alliance and Progressive Conservative parties, however, saw the region swing rightward in the new millennium.  Conservative parties gradually increased their seat numbers from 2004 onward, and by 2006 only the University City and largest urban area seat of Kingston and the Islands remained in Liberal hands.

In the 2011 election, the region was affected by the nationwide surge in support for the NDP. Although the NDP failed to win any seats in the area, they increased their popular vote share in all seven of the region's ridings, and won second place in three of the area's ridings.

The Liberal wave that swept through Ontario in 2015 saw the Liberals take four seats in eastern Ontario, mostly in more urbanized areas (Kingston, Belleville, Hawkesbury).  The Conservatives won the other four.

The 2019 election saw the Conservatives regain Hastings—Lennox and Addington, with the other seats remaining unchanged, resulting in the Conservatives winning five seats to the Liberals three.

2019 - 43rd General Election

2015 - 42nd General Election

2011 - 41st General Election

2008 - 40th General Election

2006 - 39th General Election

2004 - 38th General Election

2000 - 37th General Election

1997 - 36th General Election

1993 - 35th General Election

1988 - 34th General Election

1984 - 33rd General Election

1980 - 32nd General Election

1979 - 31st General Election

1974 - 30th General Election

1972 - 29th General Election

1968 - 28th General Election

1965 - 27th General Election

1963 - 26th General Election

1962 - 25th General Election

1958 - 25th General Election

1957 - 24th General Election

|-
| style="background-color:whitesmoke" |Carleton
|
|Frank Egan Dunlap  15,298 
||
|Dick Bell  27,865
|
|Stewart Crawford  1,334
|
|Eric Kingsley Fallis  607
|
|
||
|Vacant
|-
| style="background-color:whitesmoke" |Glengarry—Prescott
|
|Raymond Bruneau  6,661
||
|Osie Villeneuve  8,241
|
|
|
|Patrice Brunet  198
|
|René Bertrand (I. Lib)  5,414
||
|Raymond Bruneau
|-
| style="background-color:whitesmoke" |Grenville—Dundas
|
|Arthur Clark Casselman  4,402
||
|Arza Clair Casselman  8,967
| 
| 
|
|R. H. James  1,072
|
|
||
|Azra Clair Casselman
|-
| style="background-color:whitesmoke" |Lanark
|
|W. Peter Burchell  4,504
||
|William Gourlay Blair  11,629
|
| 
|
|
|
|
||
|William Gourlay Blair
|-
| style="background-color:whitesmoke" |Leeds
|
|George Taylor Fulford  10,125
||
|Hayden Stanton  11,065
|
| 
|
|Charles William Shaw  395
|
|
||
|Hayden Stanton
|-
| style="background-color:whitesmoke" |Ottawa East
||
|Jean-Thomas Richard  18,216
|
|Eleanor Blackburn  5,947
|
|William A. Layman  620
|
|Raymond Berthiaume  843
|
|
||
|Jean-Thomas Richard
|-
| style="background-color:whitesmoke" |Ottawa West
||
|George McIlraith  19,434
|
|Ethel T. Shaw  12,538
|
|David Williams  1,062
|
|Laurence M. Maloney  881
|
| 
||
|George McIlraith
|-
| style="background-color:whitesmoke" |Russell
||
|Joseph-Omer Gour  20,673
|
|Wib Nixon  12,271
|
|Harry Jacks  1,420
|
|Eddie Parisien  1,161
|
|
||
|Joseph-Omer Gour
|-
| style="background-color:whitesmoke" |Stormont 
||
|Albert Lavigne  12,505
|
|Grant Campbell  10,215
|
|
|
|Mel Rowat  646
|
|
||
|Albert Lavigne
|-
|}

Eastern